Lake Dallas High School is a public high school located in the city of Corinth, Texas. It is classified as a 5A school by the UIL.  It is part of the Lake Dallas Independent School District located in central Denton County. In 2015, the school was rated "Met Standard" by the Texas Education Agency.

It includes all of Lake Dallas, almost all of the town of Hickory Creek, and sections of Corinth and Shady Shores.

Athletics
The Lake Dallas Falcons compete in these sports 

Volleyball, Cross Country, Football, Basketball, Powerlifting, Soccer, Golf, Tennis, Track, Baseball & Softball

Baseball Team: In 2016 reached the state quarter-finals “Elite 8” in the UIL 5A playoffs.
In 2019 reached the “Sweet 16” in the UIL 5A playoffs.

Football Team: In 2015 reached the state semi-finals “Final Four” in the UIL 5A playoffs.

State titles
One Act Play 
1998(3A)

Notable people
Daryl Williams (American football) (2010), NFL player (offensive line) drafted in the 4th round Carolina Panthers. Currently plays for the Buffalo Bills (University of Oklahoma Sooners)

James Franklin (Canadian football)
CFL currently playing (quarterback) for Toronto Argonauts. (University of Missouri)

Josh Jackson (American football) currently defensive cornerback for the NFL Green Bay Packers. (University of Iowa)

Dusty Dvoracek (American Football) University of Oklahoma, Chicago Bears. Current commentator for ESPN College Football

Josiah Tauaefa (American Football) currently linebacker for the NFL New York Giants (University of Texas-San Antonio)

References

External links
Lake Dallas ISD website

Public high schools in Texas
High schools in Denton County, Texas